The 2022 Mediterranean Games, officially known as the XIX Mediterranean Games and commonly known as Oran 2022, was an international multi-sport event held from 25 June to 6 July 2022 in Oran, Algeria. Oran was announced as the host city at the ICMG General Assembly in Pescara, Italy, on 15 August 2015. 3,298 athletes (2,014 men and 1,284 women) took part in the games.

Bidding process 
Five cities signed an official declaration of candidacy for hosting the 2021 Mediterranean Games, two from Africa and three from Europe:

The final candidates were Oran and Sfax. Oran planned to take the Games to Algeria for the second time after the 1975 Mediterranean Games in Algiers.
Sfax planned to take the Games to Tunisia for the third time after the 1967 Mediterranean Games and the 2001 Mediterranean Games, both in Tunis.
Oran won by 51-17 after voting.

Host city selection 
Cities from five countries submitted their bids to host the 2021 Mediterranean Games. Oran, Algeria, has been chosen to host the Games. The North African city was elected during the International Committee for the Mediterranean Games (ICMG) General Assembly, which took place on August 27, 2015, in Pescara, Italy.

Oran took the vote by a considerable margin, winning 51 to 17 over Sfax, Tunisia, which was the other final contender to host the 2021 Games. This is the second time that an Algerian city has hosted the Mediterranean Games, the first was in 1975, in Algiers, the country's capital. Oran is the 2nd largest city in Algeria, with a population of roughly 1.2 million.

Development and preparation 
The Minister of Youth and Sports, El Hadi Ould Ali, inaugurated on October 30, 2016 at Oran, the headquarters of the organizing committee of the 19th Mediterranean Games 2021 in the presence of the Wali, Abdelghani Zaalane, the Presidents of the People's Provincial Assembly (APW), Fethallah Chaâbni, the Presidents of the People's Municipal Assembly (CPA), Nourredine Boukhatem and the President of the Algerian Olympic Committee, Mustapha Berraf. Several personalities from the world of sport took part in the inauguration as a legendary football star, Lakhdar Belloumi, and the boxer star, Mustapha Moussa, and also consuls of different Mediterranean countries.

The headquarters of the Committee was located in NLA boulevard in the old daïra completely renovated. It was Senator and Secretary General of the Organizing Committee of the Mediterranean Games (COMG), Abdelhak Kazi-Tani and Secretary General of the Algerian Sports and Olympic Committee, Abdelhafid Izem, who initialed the seat allocation paper.

Venues 
The main stadium of the 2022 Mediterranean Games is the Oran Olympic Stadium (Miloud Hadefi Stadium) which is a part of the Miloud Hadefi Olympic Complex in Bir El Djir District, Oran. The stadium hosted both the opening and closing ceremonies.

Gallery

Costs 
The Wilaya of Oran has allocated 5 billion DA for the construction of a large sports infrastructure program including an Olympic complex in Bir El Djir, Miloud Hadefi Stadium, athletics stadium, multi-purpose sports halls, center hosting sports, playgrounds and green spaces, in addition to the Mediterranean village in progress. The planned rehabilitation of the old sports infrastructure of Oran was taken.

Emblem and mascot 
The logo as well as the graphic charter of the Mediterranean Games Oran 2021 was redone in September 2019. Wihro, the mascot of the Mediterranean Games Oran 2021 represents a lion (symbol of the city of Oran) with the colors of the games and of the Mediterranean basin.

The Games

Sports 
The 2022 Mediterranean Games sports program featured 24 sports encompassing 234 events.

Participating nations

Calendar

Medal table 
Source: Medal Standings

Broadcasting 
The European broadcasting union subsidiary Eurovision Sport is the owner of the broadcasting rights according to a contract signed with CIJM.

References

External links 

 International Committee of Mediterranean Games Official website
 

 
Mediterranean Games
Mediterranean Games
International sports competitions hosted by Algeria
June 2022 sports events in Africa
July 2022 sports events in Africa
2022
Sport in Oran